John Dunbar is a retired U.S. Navy SEAL and Ironman triathlete.

Dunbar finished 2nd in the first two Ironman races - 1978 and 1979.

The competitive struggle between Dunbar and the fourteen other athletes in the 1979 race was profiled in a ten-page, 6,175 word article titled "IRONMAN" in the May 14, 1979 issue of Sports Illustrated magazine that is widely credited with launching triathlons into public prominence.

References

American male triathletes
Living people
United States Navy sailors
United States Navy SEALs personnel
Year of birth missing (living people)